Ethmia lesliesaulae is a moth in the family Depressariidae. The habitat consists of rain forests.

The ground color of the forewings is whitish, with blackish markings and two distinct spots at the base, as well as an oblique dark blotch from before the middle of the costa connecting with an elongated dark mark from the middle to the termen. The hindwing ground colour is whitish, but darker at the margins.

The larvae feed on Drymonia macrophylla, Drymonia serrulata, Drymonia warszewicziana and Drymonia alloplectoides.

Etymology
The species is named in honor of Leslie Saul.

References

Moths described in 2014
lesliesaulae